The Left Right Game is a 2020 science fiction horror podcast written by Jack Anderson, based on his series "Has anyone heard of the Left/Right Game?" originally posted on the r/nosleep subreddit in 2017. It is produced by QCODE, Automatik, and Tessa Thompson.

Plot 
Alice Sharman is a journalist who is investigating the story of a paranormal game which leads to an alternate reality. She joins up with a convoy of paranormal investigators led by Rob to investigate his claims.

Cast 
 Tessa Thompson as Alice Sharman
 Aml Ameen as Tom
 W. Earl Brown as Robert J. "Rob" Guthard
 Dayo Okeniyi as Apollo
 Inanna Sarkis as Lilith
 Jojo T. Gibbs as Eve
 Bryan Greenberg as Ace
 Robin Bartlett as Bonnie
 John Billingsley as Clyde
 Colleen Camp as Blue Jay
 Jane Wall as Mom
 Louise Lombard as Dr. Moss
 Pat Healy as The Hitchhiker
 Anna Popplewell as Laura
 Glenn Plummer as Mr. Sharman
 Ellery Sprayberry as Myra
 Amy Letcher as Jasmine

Episodes

Reception 
The series received positive reviews, receiving praise for the use of audio panning to create a surround sound experience.

Accolades

TV series 
Amazon Studios has secured the rights to The Left Right Game, Tessa Thompson will be an executive producer on the series. Jack Anderson will be writing the series and also serving as executive producer.

References

External links 
 
 
 Original Reddit thread

2020 podcast debuts
2020 podcast endings
Horror podcasts
Audio podcasts
Science fiction podcasts
Scripted podcasts
Thriller podcasts
Binaural podcasts